Winnie Ester "Magdalena" Andersson (born 9 March 1954) is a Swedish politician of the Moderate Party. She was a member of the Riksdag from 2003 until 2012, representing Jönköping County, and later governor of Västerbotten County from November 2012 to March 2020.

Parliamentary activity 
In the Riksdag, Andersson was a member of the social affairs committee 2004–2010 and the civil affairs committee 2010–2012. She was a member of the War Delegation 2006–2012, the Riksdag board 2008–2012 and the Riksdag election committee 2010–2012. Andersson was also a deputy in the Riksdag Board of Directors, the Labor Market Committee, the Housing Committee, the EU Committee, the Social Insurance Committee and the Social Affairs Committee, as well as a deputy in the combined Justice and Social Affairs Committee and the combined Foreign Affairs and Social Affairs Committee.

See also
List of governors of Västerbotten County
List of members of the Swedish Riksdag

References

External links
Magdalena Andersson at the Riksdag website 

1954 births
21st-century Swedish women politicians
Governors of Västerbotten County
Living people
Members of the Riksdag 2002–2006
Members of the Riksdag 2006–2010
Members of the Riksdag 2010–2014
Members of the Riksdag from the Moderate Party
Women county governors of Sweden
Women members of the Riksdag